The 2002 European Wrestling Championships were held in the men's Freestyle in Baku and Greco-Romane style, and the women's freestyle in Seinäjoki.

Medal table

Medal summary

Men's freestyle

Men's Greco-Roman

Women's freestyle

References

External links
Fila's official championship website

Europe
W
W
European Wrestling Championships
Euro
Euro
Sports competitions in Baku
2002 in European sport